Wolibórz  is a village in the administrative district of Gmina Nowa Ruda, within Kłodzko County, Lower Silesian Voivodeship, in south-western Poland. Prior to 1945 it was in Germany.

The village has an approximate population of 1,300.

Notable residents
 Hans Bütow (1894-1974), Admiral

References

Villages in Kłodzko County